Music Is Rotted One Note is the third studio album by English electronic musician Squarepusher, released on 12 October 1998 by Warp. The album is a departure for Squarepusher, with only elements of the familiar drum and bass style appearing in a largely jazz fusion production.

Background 
The production of Music Is Rotted One Note did not involve any sequencing or sampling equipment, which had featured heavily on Squarepusher's previous work. Many of the tracks instead have a "live" feel, featuring virtuoso playing by Squarepusher on the drums and bass guitar. His own comments on the album include:

Reception 

In 2003, Pitchfork placed Music Is Rotted One Note at number 89 on its list of the best albums of the 1990s.

Track listing

Charts

References

External links 
 Music Is Rotted One Note at Warp
 
 

Squarepusher albums
1998 albums
Warp (record label) albums
Jazz fusion albums by English artists
Post-rock albums by English artists